Kleine Ohe may refer to:

 Kleine Ohe (Danube), a river of Bavaria, Germany
 Kleine Ohe (Ilz), a river of Bavaria, Germany